The 1988 Connecticut Huskies football team represented the University of Connecticut in the 1988 NCAA Division I-AA football season.  The Huskies were led by sixth year head coach Tom Jackson, and completed the season with a record of 7–4.

Schedule

References

Connecticut
UConn Huskies football seasons
Connecticut Huskies football